Chris Clements is an animation director with The Simpsons. Prior to that, he was a character layout artist with the show. The second episode he directed, "The Haw-Hawed Couple", was nominated for a Primetime Emmy Award in 2007 for Outstanding Animated Program (Less Than One Hour).

Episodes 
 "Dude, Where's My Ranch?"
 "The Haw-Hawed Couple"
 "Papa Don't Leech"
 "Gone Maggie Gone"
 "Million Dollar Maybe"
 "Moms I'd Like to Forget"
 "The Great Simpsina"
 "The D'oh-cial Network"
 "A Totally Fun Thing That Bart Will Never Do Again"
 "A Test Before Trying"
 "Pulpit Friction"
 "Married to the Blob"
 "Luca$"
 "Walking Big & Tall"
 "Let's Go Fly a Coot"
 "The Girl Code"
 "The Marge-ian Chronicles" (co-written with Matthew Faughnan)
 "The Great Phatsby"
 "22 for 30"
 "The Girl on the Bus"
 "Bart vs. Itchy & Scratchy"
 "Todd, Todd, Why Hast Thou Forsaken Me?"
 "Highway to Well"
 "The Dad-Feelings Limited"
 "Uncut Femmes"
 "Top Goon"
 "Pin Gal" (upcoming)

References

External links
 

American animators
American animated film directors
American television directors
Living people
Year of birth missing (living people)